Doing My Best: Volume 1 is a contemporary Christian music compilation album by Steve Camp and was released by Sparrow Records in 1990. This is the first of two compilation albums under this name. The album features songs from Camp's previous Sparrow releases, Fire and Ice, Shake Me to Wake Me, One on One, After God's Own Heart and Justice; as well as one new song ("Forgive Me, Forgive You") and a remake of "Run to the Battle."

Track listing 
"Run To The Battle" (Steve Camp) – 3:54
"Forgive Me, Forgive You (guest vocals by Ashley Cleveland)" (Steve Camp, Kim Maxfield-Camp) – 4:28
"He Covers Me" (Camp, Rob Frazier, John Rosasco) – 4:45
"Do You Feel Their Pain?" (Camp, Frazier, Maxfield-Camp, McHugh) – 6:25
"Whatever You Ask" (Camp) – 4:07
"He's All You Need" (Camp, Frazier) – 5:04
"Don't Tell Them Jesus Loves Them" (Camp, Frazier) – 5:20
"Stranger To Holiness" (Camp, Frazier) – 4:20
"Surrender Your Heart" (Camp, Frazier) – 4:44
"Love That Will Not Let Me Go" (Camp, Frazier) – 5:11
"Living In Laodicea" (Camp) – 4:06
"Revive Us, Oh Lord" (Steve Camp, Carman Licciardello) – 5:12

Personnel 

 JB – lead vocal recording (1, 2)
 Ronnie Brookshire – track engineer, mixing and overdub engineer (1, 2)
 Steve Camp – lead vocals, producer (3–12)
 Ashley Cleveland – featured backing vocals (2)
 Barry Dixon – assistant engineer (1, 2)
 Chris Harris – backing vocals (1, 2)
 Barbara Hearn – art direction
 Mark Heimermann – backing vocals (1, 2)
 Paul Leim – drums (1, 2)
 Wendy McFadden – design
 Jerry McPherson – guitars (1, 2)
 Phil Naish – arrangements, keyboards and producer (1, 2)
 Susanne Norman – additional vocals (9)
 Gary Paczosa – assistant engineer (1, 2)
 Greg Parker – mix assistant (1, 2)
 Denny Purcell – mastering
 Chris Rodriguez – backing vocals (1, 2)
 John Rosasco – producer (3, 5, 6, 11, 12)
 Jackie Street – bass (1, 2)
 Mark Tucker – photography
 Cindy Wilt – production coordination
 North Beach Studio, Franklin, Tennessee – recording location (1, 2)
 Nightingale Studio, Nashville, Tennessee – recording location (1, 2)
 Duckworth Studio, Nashville, Tennessee – overdub studio (1, 2)
 MasterMix, Nashville, Tennessee – mixing location (1, 2)
 Georgetown Masters, Nashville, Tennessee – mastering location (1, 2)

References 

1990 greatest hits albums
Steve Camp compilation albums